Iwao Hirose (born 1970) is a Japanese philosopher and economist. He is currently associate professor at McGill University.

Background 
Iwao Hirose was educated at Waseda University and at University of St Andrews, where he received a PhD. Iwase has previously had tenures at the University College, Oxford and Harvard University.

Published works 
 
 
 
 Iwao Hirose. "Moral Aggregation" (Oxford University Press, 2014)
 Greg Bognar and Iwao Hirose. "The Ethics of Rationing Health Care" (Routledge, 2014)
 Iwao Hirose. "Egalitarianism" (Routledge, 2014)
  DAISY text audiobook.
 "Prioritarianism and Egalitarianism", forthcoming in Brooks, T. (ed.) New Waves in Ethics. Palgrave Macmillan (2009).
 "Should we select people randomly?", Bioethics.
 "Reconsidering the value of equality", Australasian Journal of Philosophy, (May, 2009).
 "Why be formal?", in Leopold, D. and M. Stears, (eds.) Political Theory: Methods and Approaches. Oxford University Press (2008).
 "Aggregation and non-utilitarian moral theories", Journal of Moral Philosophy, 4 (2007).
 "Weighted lotteries in life and death cases", Ratio, 20 (2007).
 "Intertemporal distributive judgments", Ethical Theory and Moral Practice, 8 (2005).
 "Aggregation and numbers", Utilitas, 16 (2004).
 "Saving the greater number without combining claims", Analysis, 61 (2001).

References

External links 
 Iwao Hirose's Research Page at McGill University
Visiting professor at Waseda University, 15 November – 14 December 2013. (Archived)

Academic staff of McGill University
1970 births
Living people
Japanese philosophers
Japanese economists
Waseda University alumni